Štrbovo is a village in the Resen Municipality of North Macedonia. Its current population is 184. Štrbovo is divided into Gorno (Upper) Štrbovo and Dolno (Lower) Štrbovo.

It is located on the eastern coast of Lake Prespa and is only 2 miles from the border with Aegean Macedonia.

The earliest known records that mention Štrbovo date back to 1538.

The village was formed in the area of Štrbovo called "Šhešuri." Later the village moved west to the location called "Rekite" (The Rivers)and soon after it relocated to another location called "Kukista."

The villagers now live in "Dolno Selo" (Lower Village) which consists of 62 houses.

"Gorno Selo" (Upper Village) is now all farm land with a few historic abandoned houses still standing.

Štrbovo has a natural river that flows through "Gorno Selo" and empties into the Krani River in the neighboring village of Krani.

A book about the village "Štrbovo Gordoct Naša" (Štrbovo, Our Pride) was written by Jonče Filipovski in the year 1998.

Demographics
Štrbovo has historically had a mostly ethnic Macedonian population.

Gallery

References

"Štrbovo, Our Pride" by Jonče Filipovski, 1998

Villages in Resen Municipality